Tanto amor, is a Mexican telenovela produced by Rita Fusaro for El Trece. It is a remake of the Argentine telenovela Pasiones produced in 1988.

Melissa Barrera and Leonardo García star as the main protagonists, while Arap Bethke, Aura Cristina Geithner and Rossana Nájera as the main antagonists.

Synopsis 
The soap opera revolves around Mía, a humble cook with big dreams who falls for Alberto Lombardo, reserved man who is not given to show his feelings.

Cast

Main 
Leonardo García as Alberto Lombardo
Melissa Barrera as Mía González
Rossana Nájera as Oriana Roldán
Andrea Noli as Carolina Méndez
Arap Bethke as Bruno Lombardo
Aura Cristina Geithner as Altagracia Roldán
Matías Novoa as David Roldán
Ofelia Medina as Silvia Lombardo

Recurring 
Omar Fierro as Jesús Roldán
Sergio Klainer as Don Óscar
María José Magan as Teresa Lombardo
Jorge Luis Velázquez as Tony García
Adianez Hernández as Noelia González
Miriam Higareda as Mary González
Ramiro Huerta as Santana
Juan Vidal as Rafael Lombardo
Ana Karina Gueva as Doña Francisca
Hugo Catalán as Eloy
Germán Valdés as René
Eva Prado as Yolanda
Valeria Galviz as Amaranta
Andrea Carreiro as Brisa
Alexis Meanas as Santiago
Christian Wolff as Jaime
Thalía Gómez as Paty
Marco de la O as Raúl
Valeria Lorduguín as Jazmín
Alan Castillo as Tavo

References 

Mexican telenovelas
TV Azteca telenovelas
2015 telenovelas
2015 Mexican television series debuts
2016 Mexican television series endings
Mexican television series based on Argentine television series